"Sittin' in My Car" is the second single released from Slick Rick's third album, Behind Bars. It was released on February 14, 1995 and was produced by Vance Wright, with a remix done by Jermaine Dupri and beatboxing done by Doug E. Fresh. The single managed to make it to #56 on the Hot R&B Singles and #11 on the Hot Rap Singles. The song title and chorus references the singer Billy Stewart's single "Sitting in the Park" and also samples the song.

Single track listing

A-Side
"Sittin' in My Car" (Def Mix)- 3:38 
"Sittin' in My Car" (LP Version)- 3:45 
"Sittin' in My Car" (Lad's Lexus Mix)Remixed by Tisdale Frederick sr aka Cuffgodd - 4:04

B-Side  
"Sittin' in My Car" (Def Instrumental)- 3:32 
"Cuz It's Wrong" (LP Version)- 3:23

1995 singles
Slick Rick songs
1994 songs
Songs written by Slick Rick
Def Jam Recordings singles